Señorita Panamá 1992, the tenth Señorita Panamá pageant, was held at the Teatro Anayansi of Atlapa Convention Centre in Panama City, Panama, on August 15, 1992, celebrating the foundation of the Old Panama City (Panamá La Vieja). The pageant was broadcast on August 24 through RPC Panamá. 15 contestants from all over the country competed for the prestigious crown. At the conclusion of the final gala, outgoing titleholder Ana Cecilia Orillac Arias crowned Giselle Amelia González Aranda as the new Señorita Panamá.

González went on to compete in the 42nd edition of the Miss Universe 1993 pageant, was held at Auditorio Nacional, Mexico City, Mexico on May 21, 1993.[1]. Michelle Harrington traveled to Sun City, South Africa, to take part in the Miss World 1992 competition.

Final Result

Contestants 
These are the competitors who have been selected this year.

Candidates Notes

Elsa Jiménez Jiménez won the Miss Hispanidad 1993.

References

External links
  Señorita Panamá  official website

Señorita Panamá
1992 beauty pageants